M3 (M Három) is a Hungarian pay television channel owned and operated by Duna Média since 2015. The channel launched as M3D, Hungary's first 3D television channel, operating between 25 June and 13 August 2012, the end of the 2012 Summer Olympics. It relaunched on 20 December 2013 at 18:00 CET as M3 centred towards archival programming. As a TV channel, it closed down on 30 April 2019 at midnight CET, and launched as an online service the following day at 08:00 CET.

Over the daytime it broadcast archive programming and during the night it broadcast MTI reports.  The channel also simulcast Híradó (06:00, 11:00 & 17:00 edition) on M1.

References

External links
 

Television networks in Hungary
Defunct television channels in Hungary
Television channels and stations established in 2012
Television channels and stations disestablished in 2019
2012 establishments in Hungary
2019 disestablishments in Hungary
Mass media in Budapest
MTVA (Hungary)